Springboro is a city in the U.S. state of Ohio. A suburb of Cincinnati and Dayton, it is located mostly in Warren County in Clearcreek and Franklin Townships; with a small portion in Miami Township in Montgomery County. The city is part of the Miami Valley. As of the 2020 census, the city had a population of 19,062.

Springboro is located at the geographic center of the Cincinnati-Dayton Metroplex, the 14th largest urban area in the United States. Most of the city is located in Warren County, and is part of Metro Cincinnati. The far northern portion is in Montgomery County, the central county of Metro Dayton. Most of Springboro is served by the Springboro Community School District and its high school, Springboro High School.

Geography

Transportation
Springboro is accessible by three of the major 
expressways in the Cin-Day Metro Region:
 I-71: From the 3-C Highway  via the Kings Mills Rd.  and  exits.
 I-675: From the Greater Dayton-Bypass  via Yankee Street at the  exit.

Central Avenue runs east–west, and Main Street is the north–south thru-way, connecting the city with the urban cores of Cincinnati and Dayton. Main Street is also used as an alternate route to Interstate-75.

Springboro is served by the Greater Dayton RTA by a single bus stop on the extreme northern border of the city at Austin Landing.

Dayton-Wright Brothers Airport is located on Springboro Pike, near the city's northern border along the Montgomery-Warren County line. The airport serves strictly private jets and small planes. The airport also serves as a small museum with a scale-replica of the original Wright-B Flyer. For commercial service, James M. Cox-Dayton International Airport and Cincinnati-Northern Kentucky International Airport are each about an hour north or south of the city, respectively.

History
Settled as early as 1796, Springboro was founded in 1815 by Jonathan Wright, as "Springborough." Jonathan Wright's father Joel was a surveyor who plotted Columbus and Dayton, Ohio and Louisville, Kentucky. Springboro was predominantly Quaker during its early years.

By the 1830s, two mills and a woolen factory in Springboro had been built up on the abundant springs for which the town was named.

As a stop on the Underground Railroad, Springboro played a significant role by providing hiding places for escaping slaves. On October 17, 1999, Springboro was the first city to erect an Ohio Underground Railroad Historic Marker. The dedication was part of the 4th Annual Ohio Underground Railroad Summit.

Beginning in the late 1960s, Springboro's population began a boom that would redefine the city. Fueled by the growth of the Dayton Area, Springboro transformed from a sleepy town along I-75 into a real estate hotspot in the Miami Valley. Growth in Springboro led to a new highway exit being created at I-75 & Austin Boulevard and the construction of three new schools by the SCCSD in the 2000s. Today Springboro is one of the most important suburbs in the Cincinnati-Dayton metro area due to its stronghold on the growth between the two major cities. The mayor of Springboro is John H. Agenbroad, who was reelected in 2019. The vast majority of new development occurred to the east of SR-741 (Main Street).

Demographics

As of the 2010 U.S. Census, the median household income for the city in 2010 was $104,803, and the median family income was $105,681. In 2012, the median household income rose to $116,012, making Springboro the 32nd wealthiest City/Town in the country. At the end of 2013 the median net worth per household was estimated at $1,499,516 and the per capita income for the city was $78,786, the highest out of all incorporated cities in Ohio. This ranks Springboro's 45066 zip-code as the 61st wealthiest in the United States. About 0.64% of families and 1.0% of the population were below the poverty line, including ≈0% of those under age 18 and 2.1% of those age 65 or over.

2010 census
As of the census of 2010, there were 17,442 people, 5,996 households, and 4,871 families living in the city. The racial makeup of the city was 92.1% White, 2.3% African American, 0.1% Native American, 3.4% Asian, 0.4% from other races, and 1.7% from two or more races. Hispanic or Latino of any race were 1.8% of the population.

There were 5,996 households, of which 47.8% had children under the age of 18 living with them, 69.4% were married couples living together, 8.1% had a female householder with no husband present, 3.7% had a male householder with no wife present, and 18.8% were non-families. 15.8% of all households were made up of individuals, and 6% had someone living alone who was 65 years of age or older. The average household size was 2.89 and the average family size was 3.24.

The median age in the city was 36.4 years. 32.2% of residents were under the age of 18; 5% were between the ages of 18 and 24; 28.5% were from 25 to 44; 25% were from 45 to 64; and 9.3% were 65 years of age or older. The gender makeup of the city was 48.9% male and 51.1% female.

2000 census
As of the census of 2000, there were 12,380 people, 4,261 households, and 3,600 families living in the city. The population density was 1,405.1 people per square mile (542.6/km). There were 4,423 housing units at an average density of 502.0 per square mile (193.8/km). The racial makeup of the city was 96.00% White, 0.99% African American, 0.16% Native American, 1.60% Asian, 0.03% Pacific Islander, 0.29% from other races, and 0.92% from two or more races. Hispanic or Latino of any race were 1.00% of the population.

There were 4,261 households, of which 48.2% had children under the age of 18 living with them, 74.8% were married couples living together, 7.3% had a female householder with no husband present, and 15.5% were non-families. 13.0% of all households were made up of individuals, and 3.9% had someone living alone who was 65 years of age or older. The average household size was 2.90 and the average family size was 3.18.

The city's population included 32.3% under the age of 18, 5.1% from 18 to 24, 34.0% from 25 to 44, 22.3% from 45 to 64, and 6.2% who were 65 years of age or older. The median age was 34 years. For every 100 females, there were 95.8 males. For every 100 females age 18 and over, there were 93.9 males.

Public safety
The Springboro police department consists of twenty-five officers and a civilian staff of three. Chief Jeffrey Kruithoff is the current police chief. Approximately 11 square miles are patrolled with service provided to more than 17,000 residents. Many areas of expertise and specialization are utilized, including Special Weapons And Tactics (SWAT), bike patrol, firearms instruction, hostage negotiation, crime prevention, juvenile diversion, and D.A.R.E.

The Clearcreek Fire District provides fire protection for the City of Springboro and Clearcreek Township. Chief Steve Agenbroad oversees the department with a staff of approximately 55 firefighters. The district covers 47 square miles, from three stations staffed with 18 firefighters per day. The district responds to around 3,000 calls each year.

Education
The city lies entirely in the Springboro Community City School District. Unincorporated areas of Franklin and Miami Townships on the west and northwest side of Springboro are served by the Franklin City School District and the Miamisburg City School District, but have Springboro addresses and share the 45066 zip code. The Springboro Community City Schools ranked Excellent with Distinction in the 2011–2012 school year and received national recognition as a Blue-Ribbon School in 2012.

Springboro has the Springboro Public Library, a branch of the Franklin-Springboro Public Library.

Arts and culture

The city is home to the 1911 Wright B Flyer Museum, as well as the La Comedia Dinner Theatre. 

Springboro also has golf courses and parks. Some of the green space belongs private neighborhoods, although the city operates a public golf course, Heatherwoode Golf Course, which opened in 1991.

Notable people
 Jake Ballard - professional football player in the National Football League (NFL)
 Tony Campana - professional baseball player in Major League Baseball
 Tommy Kessler - guitarist for Blondie
 Amy Tucker - associate head coach and interim co-head coach for Stanford Cardinal Women's Basketball
 Laura Vikmanis - NFL cheerleader and author

References

External links
 

Cities in Montgomery County, Ohio
Cities in Warren County, Ohio
Populated places on the Underground Railroad
Populated places established in 1796
Populated places established in 1815
1815 establishments in Ohio
Cities in Ohio